The 2013 New York Sportimes season was the 19th season of the franchise in World TeamTennis (WTT) including the history it inherited from the 2011 merger with the New York Buzz, the 15th season since the founding of the New York metropolitan area-franchise and its third playing home matches in both New York City and the Capital District.

The Sportimes finished in last place in the Eastern Conference and had the worst record in WTT in 2013. The team played five of its home matches in Guilderland, New York and the other two in New York City. This was the opposite of what it had done in the first two post-merger seasons.

On January 15, 2014, Sportimes CEO Claude Okin announced that the franchise had been sold to businessman Russell Geyser and his minority partner Jack McGrory, and the team would be relocated to San Diego, California and renamed the San Diego Aviators. Okin said, "This is a bittersweet event for me personally. I am very glad to have found a motivated and able new owner for the franchise: a person who will be able to re-imagine it in another great tennis town – but I will miss my team."

Season recap

Personnel changes
Prior to the 2013 roster player draft, the Sportimes traded Martina Hingis to the Washington Kastles for financial consideration. Also prior to the draft, the Sportimes acquired Anna-Lena Grönefeld from the Orange County Breakers for financial consideration. Robert Kendrick, Jesse Witten and Květa Peschke all returned for the 2013 season. Although not protected by the Sportimes in the marquee draft in February, John McEnroe was signed as a wildcard player in March, and played for the team in 2013. Claude Okin, the team's principal owner and CEO, also served as the team's coach for 2013. Abigail Spears was re-signed before the start of the season as a substitute player. She only appeared in the opening match. During the season, Eric Quigley was signed as a substitute player as well and appeared in one match. James Blake was also signed during the season as a wildcard player and appeared in one match for the Sportimes. Since WTT teams are permitted to have only one wildcard player of each gender, Blake was effectively released by the Sportimes when McEnroe was designated as the team's male wildcard player on July 18, 2013.

Return to Guilderland
After a temporary one-year absence during which it played its Capital District home matches in Troy, New York, the Sportimes returned to SEFCU Arena in Guilderland. The team reversed what it had done during the first two seasons after the merger with the Buzz by playing five of its home matches in the Capital District and only two at Sportime Stadium at Randall's Island in New York City.

Disappointing results
The Sportimes finished with a dismal record of 4 wins and 10 losses, last in the Eastern Conference and the worst record in WTT. The team's final home match in Guilderland was a 20–13 loss to the Orange County Breakers on July 18, 2013. The team's final home match in New York City was a 23–15 overtime loss to the Washington Kastles on July 23, 2013.

Event chronology
 March 11, 2013: John McEnroe who was not protected by the Sportimes in the marquee draft one month earlier, was signed by the Sportimes as a wildcard player.
 March 12, 2013: The Sportimes traded the rights to Martina Hingis to the Washington Kastles for financial consideration.
 March 12, 2013: The Sportimes acquired the rights to Anna-Lena Grönefeld in a trade with the Orange County Breakers in exchange for financial consideration.
 July 11, 2013: The Sportimes signed James Blake as a wildcard player. Blake appeared in only one match for the team.
 July 18, 2013: The Sportimes' designation of John McEnroe as their male wildcard player results in the effective release of James Blake.
 July 18, 2013: The Sportimes played what would be their final home match in the Capital District, a 20–13 loss to the Orange County Breakers at SEFCU Arena in Guilderland.
 July 23, 2013: The Sportimes played what would be their final home match in New York City, a 23–15 overtime loss to the Washington Kastles at Sportime Stadium at Randall's Island.
 July 24, 2013: The Sportimes lost their final match of the season, 20–11, to the Philadelphia Freedoms at the Pavilion dropping their record to 4 wins and 10 losses and eliminating them from playoff contention.
 January 15, 2014: Sportimes CEO Claude Okin announced that the franchise had been sold to businessman Russell Geyser and his minority partner Jack McGrory, and the team would be relocated to San Diego, California and renamed the San Diego Aviators.

Draft picks
Based on their loss in the 2012 Eastern Conference Championship Match and record of 9 wins and 5 losses, which was better than the other conference championship loser, the Sportimes had sixth selection in each round of both WTT drafts.

Marquee player draft
The Sportimes passed on both of their selections in the marquee player draft. They did not protect John McEnroe.

Roster player draft
The selections made by the Sportimes are shown in the table below.

Match log

Regular season
{| align="center" border="1" cellpadding="2" cellspacing="1" style="border:1px solid #aaa"
|-
! colspan="2" style="background:#ED1C24; color:black" | Legend
|-
! bgcolor="ccffcc" | Sportimes Win
! bgcolor="ffbbbb" | Sportimes Loss
|-
! colspan="2" | Home team in CAPS
|}

Team personnel
Reference:

Players and coaches
 Claude Okin, Coach
 James Blake
 Anna-Lena Grönefeld
 Robert Kendrick
 John McEnroe
 Květa Peschke
 Eric Quigley
 Abigail Spears
 Jesse Witten

Front office
 Claude Okin, CEO
 Jed Murray, General Manager
 Dan Fromm, Assistant General Manager

Notes:

Transactions
 February 13, 2013: The Sportimes left John McEnroe unprotected in the marquee player draft effectively making him a free agent.
 March 11, 2013: The Sportimes signed John McEnroe as a wildcard player.
 March 12, 2013: The Sportimes traded the rights to Martina Hingis to the Washington Kastles for financial consideration.
 March 12, 2013: The Sportimes acquired the rights to Anna-Lena Grönefeld in a trade with the Orange County Breakers in exchange for financial consideration.
 March 12, 2013: The Sportimes left Ashley Harkleroad unprotected in the roster player draft effectively making her a free agent.
 July 7, 2013: The Sportimes re-signed Abigail Spears as a substitute player.
 July 11, 2013: The Sportimes signed James Blake as a wildcard player, resulting in the effective release of John McEnroe.
 July 12, 2013: The Sportimes signed Eric Quigley as a substitute player.
 July 18, 2013: The Sportimes' designation of John McEnroe as their male wildcard player results in the effective release of James Blake.

See also

 2013 World TeamTennis season

References

External links
Official Team Website
Official WTT Website

New York Sportimes
San Diego Aviators seasons
New York Sportimes seasons
Tennis in New York (state)